Phlebia incarnata is a species of polypore fungus in the family Meruliaceae. It is inedible.

Taxonomy

The species was originally described as Merulius incarnatus by Lewis David de Schweinitz in 1822. In its taxonomic history, it has been transferred to the genera Cantharellus (1832), Sesia (1891), and Byssomerulius (1974), and renamed as a form of Merulius tremellosus. It was transferred to Phlebia in 1984 when Nakasone and Burdsall synonymized Merulius with Phlebia.

References

External links

Fungi described in 1822
Fungi of North America
Inedible fungi
Meruliaceae
Taxa named by Lewis David de Schweinitz